Abraham de Bruyn (c.1539, Antwerp - 1587, Cologne?) was a Flemish engraver. He established himself at Cologne about the year 1577. He is ranked among the Little Masters, on account of his plates being usually very small. He engraved in the manner of Wierix, and worked entirely with the graver, in a neat and formal style, but his drawing is far from correct. It is believed that he worked also as a goldsmith. Among his portraits, and prints of small friezes of hunting, hawking, &c., which are esteemed for their neatness, may be mentioned:

Portraits

Philip Louis, Elector Palatine.
Anne, his consort.
Albert Frederick, Duke of Prussia.
Eleonora, his Duchess.
William, Duke of Juliers.
Mary, his Duchess.
John Sambucus, physician; a woodcut.
Charles IX, King of France.
Anna, daughter of the Emperor Charles V.

Various subjects

Moses and the Burning Bush.
Four plates of the Evangelists. 1578.
Christ and the Samaritan Woman.
A Philosopher.
The Seven Planets. 1569.
The Five Senses.

A set of one hundred plates, entitled 'Imperii ac Sacerdotii Ornatus. Diversarum item Gentium peculiaris Vestitus.' 1577-78. (His best work.) Reissued, with some additional plates, and entitled ' Omnium pene Europae, Asiae, Aphricae atque Americae Gentium Habitus.' 1581.
Seventy-six plates of Horsemen. 1575.
A set of small friezes of Hunting and Hawking. 1565.
A set of twelve plates of Animals. 1583.
A set of Arabesque Patterns.
Pyramus and Thisbe; after Frans Floris.
The Resurrection of Lazarus; after Crispin van den Broeck.

References

Attribution:
 

1538 births
1587 deaths
16th-century engravers
Flemish engravers
Artists from Antwerp